Fivehead is a village and civil parish in Somerset, England, situated on the Fivehead River,  east of Taunton in the South Somerset district. In 2011 the parish, which includes the hamlet of Swell, had a population of 609.

History

Fivehead was part of the hundred of Abdick and Bulstone.

Swell Court Farmhouse dates from the mid to late 15th century.

Cathanger manor house dates from 1559, with Langford Manor having been built around the same period.

Nearby was RAF Merryfield, a World War II airfield.

Governance

The parish council has responsibility for local issues, including setting an annual precept (local rate) to cover the council's operating costs and producing annual accounts for public scrutiny. The parish council evaluates local planning applications and works with the local police, district council officers, and neighbourhood watch groups on matters of crime, security, and traffic. The parish council's role also includes initiating projects for the maintenance and repair of parish facilities, as well as consulting with the district council on the maintenance, repair, and improvement of highways, drainage, footpaths, public transport, and street cleaning. Conservation matters (including trees and listed buildings) and environmental issues are also the responsibility of the council.

The village falls within the Non-metropolitan district of South Somerset, which was formed on 1 April 1974 under the Local Government Act 1972, having previously been part of Langport Rural District. The district council is responsible for local planning and building control, local roads, council housing, environmental health, markets and fairs, refuse collection and recycling, cemeteries and crematoria, leisure services, parks, and tourism.

Somerset County Council is responsible for running the largest and most expensive local services such as education, social services, libraries, main roads, public transport, policing and fire services, trading standards, waste disposal and strategic planning.

Fivehead is also part of a county constituency represented in the House of Commons of the Parliament of the United Kingdom. It elects one Member of Parliament (MP) by the first past the post system of election, and was part of the South West England constituency of the European Parliament prior to Britain leaving the European Union in January 2020, which elected seven MEPs using the d'Hondt method of party-list proportional representation.

Geography

There are two nearby Sites of Special Scientific Interest at Fivehead Arable Fields and Fivehead Woods and Meadow.

Religious sites

The Church of St. Catherine in Swell Lane dates from the 12th century, while the Church of St. Martin in the village is slightly more recent dating from the 13th century. Both are grade I listed buildings.

Notable residents
 John Barnwell – Somerset cricketer died in the village in 1998.

References

External links

 Fivehead village website

Villages in South Somerset
Civil parishes in Somerset